Vasum aedificatum is an extinct species of medium to large sea snail, a marine gastropod mollusk in the family Turbinellidae.

Description
a carnivorous sea snail. Measurements of the shell are 62.6 mm x 33.3 mm.

Distribution
Fossils of this marine species have been found in Miocene to Pliocene strata of the Dominican Republic. (age range: 7.246 to 5.332 Ma)

References

 E. H. Vokes. 1998. Neogene Paleontology in the Northern Dominican Republic 18. The Superfamily Volutacea (in part) (Mollusca: Gastropoda). Bulletins of American Paleontology 113(354):1-54

aedificatum
Gastropods described in 1876